Velmakanne is a village and a Gram panchayat of Munugode mandal, Nalgonda district, in Telangana state.

References

Villages in Nalgonda district